Prairie View A&M University (PVAMU or PV) is a public historically black land-grant university in Prairie View, Texas. Founded in 1876, it is one of Texas's two land-grant universities and the second oldest public institution of higher learning in the state. It offers baccalaureate degrees in 50 academic majors, 37 master's degrees and four doctoral degree programs through eight colleges and the School of Architecture. PVAMU is the largest HBCU in the state of Texas and the third largest HBCU in the United States.  PVAMU is a member of the Texas A&M University System and Thurgood Marshall College Fund.

Prairie View A&M fields 18 intercollegiate sports team, commonly known by their "Prairie View A&M Panthers" nickname. Prairie View A&M competes in National Collegiate Athletic Association (NCAA) Division I and the Southwestern Athletic Conference (SWAC).  Prairie View A&M is the only charter member remaining in the conference.

History 

The university was established by Article 7 of the Texas Constitution of 1876, created near the end of the Reconstruction Era after the American Civil War. In that year, State Senator Matthew Gaines and State Representative William H. Holland – both former slaves who became leading political figures – crafted legislation for the creation of a state-supported "Agricultural and Mechanical" college. In the article, the constitution stated that "Separate schools shall be provided for the white and colored children, and impartial provisions shall be made for both." The legislation made Prairie A&M the first state supported institution of higher learning for African Americans in Texas.

In an effort to comply with these constitutional provisions, the Fifteenth Texas Legislature, consistent with terms of the federal Morrill Land-Grant Colleges Act – which provided public lands for the establishment of colleges – authorized the "Alta Vista Agriculture and Mechanical College for the Benefit of Colored Youth" as part of the Agriculture and Mechanical College of Texas (now Texas A&M University). It was established on the former Alta Vista Plantation.

In 1945, the name of the institution was changed from Prairie View Normal and Industrial College to Prairie View University, and the school was authorized to offer, "as need arises," all courses offered at the University of Texas. In 1947, the Texas Legislature changed the name to Prairie View A&M College of Texas and provided that "courses be offered in agriculture, the mechanics arts, engineering, and the natural sciences connected therewith, together with any other courses authorized at Prairie View at the time of passage of this act, all of which shall be equivalent to those offered at the Agricultural and Mechanical College of Texas at Bryan." And finally in 1973, the legislature changed the name of the institution to Prairie View Agricultural & Mechanical University (Prairie View A&M University).

In 1983, the Texas Legislature proposed a constitutional amendment to restructure the Permanent University Fund (PUF) to include Prairie View A&M University as a beneficiary of its proceeds. The 1983 amendment also dedicated the university to more enhancements as an "institution of the first class" under the governing board of the Texas A&M University System. The constitutional amendment was approved by the voters on November 6, 1984.

In 2000, the Governor of Texas signed the Priority Plan, an agreement with the U.S. Department of Education Office of Civil Rights to establish Prairie View A&M University as an educational asset accessible by all Texans. The Priority Plan mandates creation of many new educational programs and facilities. It also requires removing language from the Institutional Mission Statement which might give the impression of excluding any Texan from attending Prairie View A&M University.

In December 2020, philanthropist MacKenzie Scott donated $50 million to Prairie View A&M.  The donation is the largest single gift in its history and the largest ever to a HBCU.

In 2021, Prairie View A&M attained the R2 Carnegie Classification (Doctoral University; High Research Activity).  Prairie View A&M is one of only 11 HBCUs to be granted R2 status and one of only four Texas A&M University System members in this category.

Academics 
Prairie View A&M University offers academic programs through the following administrative units:
 Nathelyne A. Kennedy School of Architecture

 College of Agriculture and Human Sciences
 Marvin and June Brailsford College of Arts and Sciences
 College of Business
 Whitlow R. Green College of Education
 Roy G. Perry College of Engineering
 College of Juvenile Justice and Psychology
 College of Nursing
 Office of Graduate Studies

Prairie View A&M established the Texas Undergraduate Medical Academy (UMA) in 2004 which is a highly selective and rigorous pre-medical program designed to prepare and mentor academically talented undergraduate students for success in medical school.  UMA began as a result of a Texas legislative mandate in 2003 and is state funded with a mission to increase minority representation in the medical field and redress statewide physician and dentist shortages.

Prairie View A&M established a highly selective honors program for academically exceptional undergraduates who meet the specified criteria.

Prairie View A&M is consistently recognized as one of the top institutions in the country for producing the highest number of African-American architects and engineers by Diverse Issues in Higher Education.

Prairie View A&M annually awards the second most STEM degrees in the Texas A&M University System.

Prairie View A&M academic programs are accredited by the Southern Association of Colleges and Schools Commission on Colleges and each college within the university holds additional accreditation or certifications.

For 2023, U.S. News & World Report ranked Prairie View A&M #331-440 in National Universities, #154 in Top Performers on Social Mobility (tie), #169-227 in Top Public Schools, #26 in Historically Black Colleges and Universities (tie), #196-212 in Best Undergraduate Engineering Programs, and #293 in Nursing.

John B. Coleman Library
The John B. Coleman Library is the main library on campus.  It is a five-story, 150,000 square foot building completed in 1988.  The library provides several services to assist students and is home to over 370,000 Volumes, including over 700 print periodicals, and close to 4,000 media materials.  The library is also home to an art gallery and a vast collection of historic and special archives.

Campuses 

The campus is often referred to as "The Hill" because it rests on a hill in the region. The campus is also often described as one of the most beautiful in Texas.

Prairie View A&M has two smaller branch campuses in Houston with the Northwest Houston Center and the College of Nursing in the Texas Medical Center. The branch campuses offer several degree programs.

Demographics 

In fall 2014, the university enrolled 6,932 undergraduate students, 1,265 students in masters programs, and 146 in doctorate programs. 5,111 (61%) of the undergraduate students were female and 3,232 (39%) were male. Also in fall 2014, of the 8,343 students enrolled, 6,958 (83%) were African-American, non-Hispanic; 267 (3%) were white, non-Hispanic; 420 (5%) were Hispanic; 234 (3%) were Asian; 33 were Native American or Alaska natives; 6 were Hawaiian; 144 (2%) were multiracial; 237 (3%) were "international;" and the ethnicity of 44 (1%) was unknown or unreported. The percentage of African-Americans slightly dropped from 86% in fall 2010 and the percentage of Hispanic and international students had slightly increased. 7,682 (92%) of the students were from Texas, 456 (5%) were from other states, and 205 (2%) were from other countries.

Student life

Housing 

In 1998 American Campus Communities (ACC) was awarded the contract to develop, build, and manage a student housing property at PVAMU. Both student residence housing properties at PVAMU are owned and operated by ACC. Freshmen students on campus may reside in the University College community. Upperclassmen may live in apartment style living in University Village (phases I, II, III, VI, and VII). The first of these apartment buildings was built in 1995. The University Square, completed in October 2017, is the newest student housing facility on campus with 466 beds available for juniors, seniors, and graduate students.

About 50% of PVAMU undergraduate students live on campus.

Previous buildings that formerly housed students include Alexander Hall, Banks Hall, Buchanan Hall, Collins Hall, Drew Hall, L. O. Evans Hall, Fuller Hall, Holley Hall, and Suarez Hall. Suarez Hall was already closed in 1996. In 1997 Alexander Hall, Buchanan Hall, and Collins Hall had closed. In 1998 Holley Hall had closed. In 2000 Drew Hall, Evans Hall, and Fuller Hall had closed. During the same year, Alexander, Buchanan, and Holley had been demolished. In 2001 Banks Hall had closed.

Student organizations 
PVAMU is home to over 150 honorary, professional, special interest, and Greek organizations established on campus.  Since 1982, the Student Government Association (SGA) has been the highest ranking student organization on campus and official voice of the student body to the University Administration, as well as all internal and external organizations.

Student activities

Athletics 

Prairie View A&M University offers a wide variety of varsity and intramural sports programs.

Men's and women's athletic teams are nicknamed the Panthers and the team colors are purple and gold.  Prairie View A&M is a charter member of the Southwestern Athletic Conference (SWAC), and is a member of the West Division. Prairie View competes in NCAA Division I in all varsity sports; in football, the Panthers play in the Division I FCS.

Prairie View's most notable rivals are Texas Southern University and Grambling State University.

Football 

In summer 2016, Prairie View A&M completed the first phase of construction on its $60 million football stadium and athletic field house.  The state-of-the-art facility is 55,000 square feet and holds up to 15,000 people.  The final phase of construction will increase capacity to 30,000 people. In fall 2018, Aaron "General" Walker donated $25 million to Panther stadium. A statue is soon to be built.

Men's basketball 

All home basketball games are held in the William Nicks Building which was built in the early 1960s. The building has gone
through several renovations since its inception and holds approximately 6,500 people.

Baseball 
Prior to a double header against the Texas Southern Tigers, a ribbon cutting ceremony was held for the renovated baseball stadium on April 26, 2014.  Along with the opening, the stadium was formally dedicated to former Panthers baseball coach, John W. Tankersley.  The renovated stadium features seating for 512 including 192 chair backed seats, new concession stand, new restrooms, press box, and bricked dugouts.  The stadium is also Wi-Fi enabled.  The Panthers dedicated the stadium sweeping the double header winning 9–0 and 7–4.

Marching Storm 

Prairie View A&M's marching band is officially known as the Marching Storm and has close to 300 active members. Some of the band accomplishments include performing at the Super Bowl, the Macy's Thanksgiving Day Parade, a U.S. presidential inauguration, the Tournament of Roses Parade, the Honda Battle of the Bands, the Houston Rodeo, the grand opening of the NRG Stadium, and at a 2004 Dallas Cowboys game with Destiny's Child.  The band made an appearance on MTV in 2011. In 2022, the band starred in a TV docuseries entitled "March" on The CW Network. From 1984 to 2009 the marching band was directed by George Edwards.  The band is currently under the direction of Dr. Tim Zachary.

Black Foxes
The Black Foxes are the 15–20 member danceline that accompanies the band.

Twirling Thunder
The Twirling Thunder are the 20-25 member color guard that performs with the band.

Notable alumni

See also 
 Ruth Simmons, First black president of an Ivy League institution and the first woman president of Prairie View A&M
Flossie M. Byrd, First Provost and Vice President for Academic Affairs at Prairie View A&M
KPVU 91.3 FM Radio, Prairie View A&M radio station
History of African Americans in Houston

Notes

References

External links 

 

 
Webarchive template wayback links
Educational institutions established in 1876
Historically black universities and colleges in the United States
Land-grant universities and colleges
Texas A&M University System
Universities and colleges accredited by the Southern Association of Colleges and Schools
Public universities and colleges in Texas
Education in Waller County, Texas
Buildings and structures in Waller County, Texas
1876 establishments in Texas
Historically black universities and colleges in Texas